The Gäu Perimeter Way is a hiking trail in the Northern Black Forest in Germany and the easternmost of the long distance paths managed by the Black Forest Club. With a length of 120 kilometres, it runs in six stages from Mühlacker to Freudenstadt.

The waymark of the Gäu Perimeter Way is a green diamond with a red rose hip on a white background.

Short description 

The Gäu Perimeter Way runs between the NPlacehern Black Forest in the west and the Strohgäu and Heckengäu in the east. From Mühlacker in the Enz valley the route runs via Pinache and Wiernsheim past  Mönsheim to Friolzheim, Tiefenbronn and Steinegg. From there it continues via Neuhausen and Simmozheim past Althengstett to Calw-Stammheim. The path then passes through the villages of Gültlingen and Sulz am Eck, before reaching the Nagold valley in the town of Nagold. It then continues via  Rohrdorf and Beihingen to Haiterbach. From Haiterbach the route runs through Salzstetten to Schopfloch and then through Glatten to Freudenstadt.

Day tours/stages

First Stage: Mühlacker – Steinegg 
 Distance: 22 kilometres
 Duration: c. 5.5 hours

Second Stage: Steinegg – Calw-Stammheim 
 Distance: 24 kilometres
 Duration: c. 6 hours

Third Stage: Stammheim – Wasserturm Oberjettingen 
 Distance: 20 kilometres
 Duration: c. 5 hours

Fourth Stage: Wasserturm Oberjettingen – Beihingen 
 Distance: 20 kilometres
 Duration: c. 5 hours

Fifth Stage: Beihingen – Schopfloch 
 Distance: 19 kilometres
 Duration: c. 5 hours

Sixth Stage: Schopfloch – Freudenstadt 
 Distance: 14 kilometres
 Duration: c. 4 hours

Literature 
 Reinhard Distel and Heinz R. Wittner: Wanderführer Schwarzwald-Heightnwege. 7th edn., Ostfildern, 1997. . pp. 142–153.
 Martin Kuhnle: Schwarzwald Mitte/Nord. Bergverlag Rother, Munich, 2013. . pp. 60–79.
 Gäu.Rand.Weg, Faltblatt, Plenum Heckengäu

External links 
 Black Forest hiking service: web facility of the Black Forest Club for visualising the Black Forest trails on Google Maps with various overlays (trail network, waymarks, accommodation, …)
 Heckengäu-Natur-Nah – Description of the Gäu Perimeter Way and overview map

Hiking trails in Baden-Württemberg
Transport in the Black Forest